The 2021 Tandridge District Council election took place on 6 May 2021 to elect members of Tandridge District Council in England. This was on the same day as other local elections.

Ward results
Asterisk indicates incumbent Councillor seeking re-election.

Bletchingley & Nutfield

Burstow, Horne & Outwood

Chaldon

Godstone

Harestone

Oxted North & Tandridge

Oxted South

Portley

Queen's Park

Valley

Warlingham East, Chelsham & Farleigh

Warlingham West

Westway

Whyteleafe

Woldingham

By-elections between 2021 and 2022

Felbridge (17 June 2021)
A by-election was held in Felbridge on 17 June 2021 following the death of Conservative Councillor Ken Harwood in 2020. This was due to take place on 6 May 2021, but was postponed following the death of the Labour candidate Christopher Kelly.

References

Tandridge
Tandridge District Council elections
Council elections in Surrey